LA Galaxy OC was an American soccer club based in Irvine, California that played in United Women's Soccer.  The team played its home games at the Championship Soccer Stadium in the Orange County Great Park.

History

Year-by-Year

Current Team

Former Players & Staff

References

Women's soccer clubs in California
2018 establishments in California
United Women's Soccer teams
Association football clubs established in 2018
Sports teams in Los Angeles